Panagiotis Plavoukos (born 21 October 1994) is a Greek footballer who plays for Aittitos Spata.

Career
Panagiotis started his professional career in Thrasyvoulos. Plavoukos came up through Thrasyvoulos youth system, he was promoted to the first team squad in 2012 eventually becoming a regular starter. He played in thirty five matches. Plavoukos impressed Veria's scouting team and was signed on a free transfer until 2016. On August 20, 2014 Panagiotis agreed to a mutual termination with Veria.

External links

1994 births
Living people
Veria F.C. players
Super League Greece players
Association football forwards
Panelefsiniakos F.C. players
Footballers from Athens
Greek footballers